The 2008–09 Tercera División was the fourth tier of football in Spain. Play started on 30 August 2008 and ended on 28 June 2009 with the promotion play-off finals.

Overview
There were 363 clubs competing in  Tercera División (Third division) in the 2008–09 season, divided into 18 regional groups, each accommodating between 20 and 21 clubs.

The following clubs finished as champions of their respective groups

Grupo I (Galicia) - Compostela
Grupo II (Asturias) - Oviedo
Grupo III (Cantabria) - Gimn. Torrelavega
Grupo IV (País Vasco) - Lagun Onak
Grupo V (Cataluña) - Espanyol B
Grupo VI (Comunidad Valenciana) - Villajoyosa
Grupo VII (Comunidad de Madrid) - Alcalá
Grupo VIII (Castilla & León) - Palencia
Grupo IX (Andalucía Oriental (Almería, Granada, Jaén & Málaga) & Melilla) - Unión Estepona
Grupo X (Andalucía Occidental (Cádiz, Córdoba, Huelva & Sevilla) & Ceuta) - San Roque
Grupo XI (Islas Baleares) - Mallorca B
Grupo XII (Canarias) - Tenerife B
Grupo XIII (Región de Murcia) - Caravaca
Grupo XIV (Extremadura) - Cerro Reyes
Grupo XV (Navarra) - Izarra
Grupo XVI (La Rioja) - Varea
Grupo XVII (Aragón) - Monzón
Grupo XVIII (Castilla-La Mancha) - Toledo

The 18 group champion clubs participated in the Group winners promotion play-off and the losers from these 9 play-off ties then proceeded to the Non-champions promotion play-off with clubs finishing second, third and fourth.

League standings

Group I - Galicia

Group II - Asturias

Group III - Cantabria

Group IV - Basque Country

Group V - Catalonia

Group VI - Valencian Community

Group VII - Community of Madrid

Group VIII - Castilla and León

Group IX - Eastern Andalusia and Melilla

Group X - Western Andalusia and Ceuta

Group XI - Balearic Islands

Group XII - Canary Islands

Group XIII - Region of Murcia

Group XIV - Extremadura

Group XV - Navarra

Group XVI - La Rioja

Group XVII - Aragón

Group XVIII - Castilla-La Mancha

Promotion play-offs

Group winners promotion play-off 
Promoted to Segunda División B: Gimn. de Torrelavega, Unión Estepona, Villajoyosa, Varea, Espanyol B, Real Oviedo, Toledo, Palencia and Compostela.

Non-champions promotion play-off 
Promoted to Segunda División B: Izarra, San Roque, Alcalá, Cerro Reyes, Sporting Mahonés, Cacereño, Caravaca, Mallorca B and Mirandés.

Notes

External links
 Real Federación Española de Fútbol
Futbolme.com
Lapreferente.com

 
Tercera División seasons
4
Spanish